The Afghanistan men's national team represents Afghanistan in international cricket. Cricket has been played in Afghanistan since the mid-19th century, but it was only in the early 21st century that the national team began to enjoy success. The Afghanistan Cricket Board was formed in 1995 and became an affiliate member of the International Cricket Council (ICC) in 2001 and a member of the Asian Cricket Council (ACC) in 2003. After nearly a decade of playing international cricket, on 22 June 2017, at an ICC meeting in London, full ICC Membership (and therefore Test status) was granted to Afghanistan. Alongside Ireland, this took the number of Test cricket playing nations to twelve. It is the first country to ever achieve Full Member status after holding Affiliate Membership of the ICC.

The team is ranked 10th in Twenty20 International (T20I) cricket as of February 2023, and holds the world record for the highest ever T20I score, with their score of 278/3 against Ireland at Dehradun on 23 February 2019.

In August 2021, concerns and doubts were raised over the participation of the Afghanistan national cricket team in the future international matches ever since Afghanistan was brought under the control of the Taliban. Concerns were raised over the safety of Afghan national cricketers and their families who were still in Afghanistan during the Taliban takeover on 15 August 2021. , three of the Afghanistan women's national cricket team had evacuated to Canada, while the others were afraid of how they, as women, would be treated by the Taliban.

Taliban spokespersons stated that the Taliban would not disrupt the men's cricket team's participation in international matches and that they would allow Afghanistan to play its first ever bilateral series against Pakistan in Sri Lanka which was scheduled to start in September 2021. The Pakistan Cricket Board announced in August 2021 that the tour would be rescheduled to 2022. As of November 2022, the tour had not taken place.

Despite the political turmoil, Afghanistan cricket team's media manager Hikmat Hassan confirmed that Afghanistan would participate in the 2021 ICC Men's T20 World Cup.

History

Pre-ODI history
The earliest record of cricket in Afghanistan is of British troops playing a match in Kabul in 1839, though it appears that no long lasting legacy of cricket was left by the British. In the 1990s, cricket became popular amongst the Afghan refugees residing in Pakistan, and the Afghanistan Cricket Board was formed there in 1995. They continued to play cricket on their return to their home country. Like all sports, cricket was initially banned by the Taliban, but cricket became an exception in 2000 (being the only sport in Afghanistan to be approved by the Taliban) and the Afghanistan Cricket Federation was elected as an affiliate member of the ICC the following year. The cricketing style, reflecting the background of development in refugee camps in Pakistan, is like the style characteristic of Pakistani cricketing practice generally, the emphasis on fast bowling and wrist spin for example.

The national team was invited to play in the second tier of Pakistani domestic cricket the same year, and the tour brought international media attention to Afghan cricket when the US-led invasion of the country began whilst the team was in Pakistan. The team lost three and drew two of the five matches on the tour.

Originally the Taliban regime in Afghanistan had banned cricket as they had banned most other sports, but in early 2000 there was a change of heart and the government wrote to the Pakistan Cricket Board asking for the PCB's support for an Afghan application to the ICC. The conflict in Afghanistan shortly afterwards led to a large number of Afghan refugees fleeing to Pakistan, where some learned to play cricket, and the presence of Pakistani peacekeeping troops in Afghanistan later helped this process.

In 2001, the Afghan side took part in a four-match tour of Pakistan, visiting Peshawar and Rawalpindi, and the team also visited in 2003 and 2004. In 2004 Afghanistan played in the Asian Cricket Council Trophy in Kuala Lumpur - the regional qualifying competition for the ICC Trophy - and performed respectably, with the highlight being a surprise win over hosts Malaysia.

They played in two Pakistani tournaments in 2003, winning their first match that year. They began playing in Asian regional tournaments in 2004, finishing sixth in their first ACC Trophy. More success began in 2006 when they were runners-up to Bahrain in the Middle East Cup and beat an MCC side featuring former England captain Mike Gatting by 171 runs in Mumbai. Gatting was dismissed for a duck.

They toured England in the summer of 2006, winning six out of seven matches. Three of their wins came against the second XIs of Essex, Glamorgan and Leicestershire. They finished third in the ACC Trophy that year, beating Nepal in a play-off match.

They won their first tournament in 2007, sharing the ACC Twenty20 Cup with Oman after the two tied in the final. They began their qualifying campaign for the 2011 World Cup in Jersey in 2008, winning Division Five of the World Cricket League. They finished third in the ACC Trophy Elite tournament the same year, and won a second consecutive WCL tournament, Division Four in Tanzania later in the year.

In January 2009, Afghanistan progressed to the 2009 World Cup Qualifier by winning Division Three of the World Cricket League in Buenos Aires, topping the table on net run rate ahead of Uganda and Papua New Guinea.

ODI status

In the 2011 Cricket World Cup qualifying tournament, Afghanistan failed to progress to the World Cup, but earned ODI status for four years. Their first ODI was against Scotland in the 5th place playoff, having previously beaten the Scots earlier in the tournament; Afghanistan won by 89 runs.

In the Intercontinental Cup Afghanistan played its first first-class match against a Zimbabwe XI in a four-day match in Mutare. During the match, which was drawn, Afghan batsman Noor Ali scored centuries in both his innings, making him only the fourth player to do so on their first-class debut. Later, in August 2009, they played the Netherlands in same competition at the VRA Cricket Ground, winning a low-scoring match by one wicket.

Afghanistan then took part in the 2009 ACC Twenty20 Cup in the United Arab Emirates. Afghanistan were drawn in Group A, a group which Afghanistan topped at the end of the group stages by winning all five of their matches. In the semi-finals the Afghans defeated Kuwait by 8 wickets. In the final they met the hosts, the United Arab Emirates, whom they defeated by 84 runs.

On 1 February 2010, Afghanistan played their first Twenty20 International against Ireland, which they lost by 5 wickets. On 13 February 2010, Afghanistan defeated the United Arab Emirates by 4 wickets to make their way to the 2010 ICC World Twenty20 to be in the West Indies in April 2010. Later the same day they defeated Ireland by 8 wickets in the Final of 2010 ICC World Twenty20 Qualifier to win the qualifier. Afghanistan were in Group C of the main tournament, with India and South Africa. During their first match against India, opening batsman Noor Ali hit 50 runs, helping Afghanistan to a score of 115 in their 20 overs. Despite this they lost the match by 8 wickets. In their second match, the team were reduced to 14/6 at one stage, before a late rally from Mirwais Ashraf and Hamid Hassan helped Afghanistan post 88 all out, resulting in a loss by 59 runs.

The team's Intercontinental Cup campaign continued in 2010, with wins over Ireland, Canada, Scotland and Kenya before they beat Scotland by 7 wickets in the final in Dubai. Also in 2010, they won the ACC Trophy Elite tournament in Kuwait, beating Nepal in the final and finished third in Division One of the World Cricket League in the Netherlands. They took part in the cricket tournament at the 2010 Asian Games in China and won the silver medal, losing to Bangladesh in the final.

In 2011, Afghanistan begun the 2011-13 ICC World Cricket League Championship. They beat Canada and drew with the UAE. In the parallel one-day league, they won two matches against Canada and lost twice to the UAE.  In December once again took part in the ACC Twenty20 Cup, this time in Nepal.  They went on to win all of their matches to once again take the Cup.

In 2012 Afghanistan took on new levels of competition.  They played their first One Day International against a Full Member of the International Cricket Council in February 2012 when they played a match against Pakistan at Sharjah. They also took on the Australia Cricket Team in an Only ODI at Sharjah in August 2012. They fell short in both matches, but their performance showed they were continuing to make progress. Their 2012 ICC International Cup games were also challenging, resulting in a split with the Netherlands and a loss to Ireland.

2013 brought greater success for Afghanistan.  In March, they played two T20 Internationals against Scotland in UAE and prevailed in both matches. They also won two ODIs in the World Cricket League Championship against the same opponents.

In the WCL Championship table, as 2013 dawned Afghanistan was level with Scotland in third, trailing Ireland and the Netherlands for the two automatic qualification spots for the 2015 World Cup. However, two convincing wins in spring over Scotland boosted hopes some. Then in July the Netherlands failed to take any points against Ireland, leaving Afghanistan in position to qualify if they could win their final four matches, against poorer performing Namibia and Kenya.  Despite the United Arab Emirates and the Netherlands both being able to win their remaining games, keeping the pressure on Afghanistan, Afghanistan handled Namibia, then defeated Kenya by 8 wickets on 2 October. With one final win over Kenya on 4 October by 7 wickets, Afghanistan secured second in the Championship with 19 points, and qualified for World Cup.

Afghanistan also crushed Scotland in their one-day ICC Intercontinental Cup league in March in Abu Dhabi: Afghanistan (275: Shah 67*, Davey 4–53) beat Scotland (125: Taylor 48*, Dawlatzai 6–57 and 145: Coetzer 57, Dawlatzai 5–37) by an innings and 5 runs. Izatullah Dawlatzai took eleven wickets.

In July 2014 Afghanistan toured Zimbabwe to play its 1st full series against a full member. The 4 match ODI series finished 2–2 and the 2 match first class series finished 1–1.

With their victory over Zimbabwe on 25 December 2015, Afghanistan entered the top 10 of the ICC's ODI rankings for the first time.

Associate Membership

Afghanistan had become an Affiliate member of the ICC in 2001. Then in 2009 it had attained one-day status until 2015. They are currently developing their domestic cricket infrastructure, and have signed a two-year deal with the Pakistan board for the development of Afghanistan cricket ahead of the 2015 World Cup.

In 2012, the Asian Cricket Council decided to nominate Afghanistan for Associate membership with the ICC, with the request being looked into at the ICC's annual conference in June. Becoming an Associate would mean higher funding (the ICC had been paying $700,000 in annual funding to Afghanistan's organization, suggested to rise to $850,000 for Associate status), and also importantly would mean more exposure for the passionate and cricket-starved players from war-torn Afghanistan.

In March 2013, Afghanistan received a further support boost when a two-year Memorandum of Understanding (MoU) was signed between the Afghanistan Cricket Board (ACB) and Pakistan Cricket Board (PCB) for the development of Afghanistan cricket ahead of the 2015 World Cup.

The PCB provided technical and professional support, including game-education programmes, coaching courses, skill and performance analysis, and basic umpiring and curator courses. High performance camps for emerging players were also organised. The PCB-regulated National Cricket Academy (NCA) helped in improving technical, tactical, mental and physical skills, and hosted lectures on doping, anti-corruption and various codes of conduct.

In April 2013, the Afghanistan Cricket Board (ACB) was also allocated US$422,000 (22,400,000 AFN approx.) from the ICC's targeted assistance and performance programme. The world governing body of cricket approved the grant at its IDI (ICC Development International) board meeting, which concluded in Dubai.  The money, to be given over three years, was aimed at developing more competitive teams among ICC Full, Associate and Affiliate members. Previous countries to receive similar funding programmes included the Netherlands, Scotland, the West Indies, Zimbabwe and Ireland. An ICC statement suggested the funding was targeted towards the development of the National Cricket Academy in Kabul.

On 26 June 2013 at the ICC's annual meeting in London, England, Afghanistan received its Associate Membership with the statement:

 "Afghanistan is the only country that receives the Associate Membership in a short period of time in reward to the efforts Afghanistan made for the promotion of cricket," (Dr Noor Muhammad, CEO of the Afghanistan Cricket Board (ACB), on the ACC website)

2015 Cricket World Cup

Afghanistan made their World Cup debut in the 50 over format of the game against Bangladesh at the Manuka Oval in Canberra, Australia. The match resulted in a 105 run defeat.

The competition saw the team compete against elite cricketing nations such as Australia, India, Sri Lanka, South Africa, New Zealand and England. Qualification for the tournament was a historic feat for cricket in Afghanistan, one amplified by the fact that the team included many players who picked up the game in refugee camps outside their long-suffering country.

On 26 February 2015, Afghanistan won their first World Cup match against Scotland, winning by one wicket. The team however, lost all its remaining games and were knocked out of the tournament in the opening round.

Post-World Cup tours
The team visited Zimbabwe for the second time in October where Afghanistan clinched a historic one-day international series over Zimbabwe after a 73-run victory in Bulawayo saw them win 3–2.

Doing so, they became the first non-Test-playing country to win a multi-game bilateral ODI series against a Test side. The Afghanistan cricket team toured the United Arab Emirates to play the United Arab Emirates cricket team in December 2016. The tour consisted of three Twenty20 International (T20I) matches. Afghanistan won the series 3–0. The Afghanistan cricket team toured Bangladesh in September and October 2016 to play three One Day Internationals (ODIs) matches. This was Afghanistan's first full series against a Test-playing side other than Zimbabwe and was the first bilateral series between the two sides.

Ahead of the ODI series there was a fifty-over warm-up game between the Bangladesh Cricket Board XI and Afghanistan in Fatullah. Afghanistan won the warm-up match by 66 runs and Bangladesh won the ODI series 2–1.

In February 2017 the International Cricket Council (ICC) awarded first-class status to Afghanistan's four-day domestic competition.

The Afghan cricket team toured Zimbabwe between January and February 2017. The tour consisted of five One Day International(ODI) matches. Prior to the ODI series, the Afghanistan A cricket team played five "unofficial" ODI matches against the Zimbabwe A cricket team. All of those matches had been designated List A status. Afghanistan won the initial List A series 4–1 and the ODI series 3–2.
2017

The Ireland cricket team toured India during March 2017 to participate in a series of matches against Afghanistan, consisting of three T20 matches, five ODI contests and an ICC Intercontinental Cup match. All the matches took place in Greater Noida. The Afghan team were highly successful, emerging victorious in both the T20I series 3–0 and the ODI series 3–2. Afghanistan also won the ICC Intercontinental Cup match, by the margin of an innings and 172 runs.

The Afghanistan cricket team completed another tour in June 2017, this time facing the West Indies. The tour marked Afghanistan's first bilateral tour against a full member nation other than Zimbabwe. (Later that month, Afghanistan itself was awarded that status). The tour was less successful for the Afghans, who were convincingly defeated 3–0 in the T20 series. They performed better in the ODI series, seizing a 1–1 draw after the final match was washed out with no result. Afghanistan registered their first win against Sri Lanka in Asia Cup.

Towards Test status
Afghanistan qualified for 2012 ICC World Twenty20 held in Sri Lanka as the runner up of the ICC World Twenty20 Qualifier and joined India and England in the group stage. In the first match against India on 19 September, Afghanistan won the toss and elected to field. India posted 159/5 in 20 overs but Afghanistan fell short of that target by scoring 136 in 19.3 overs. In the second match against England on 21 September, Afghanistan won the toss and again elected to field. England set a target of 196/5 (20 overs) but Afghanistan were all out for 80 in 17.2 overs. England and India qualified for the Super Eights and Afghanistan were eliminated as a result of this match.

On 3 October 2013, Afghanistan beat Kenya to finish second in the WCL Championship and qualify for the 2015 Cricket World Cup, becoming the 20th team to gain entry into the tournament overall. Afghanistan secured their passage to Australia and New Zealand in 2015 by beating Kenya comprehensively for the second time in succession in Sharjah, sealing their maiden World Cup qualification. They finished second in the World Cricket League Championship — nine wins in 14 matches — and joined Ireland as the second Associate team in the 2015 World Cup, while the remaining two spots for Associates will be decided by a qualifying tournament in New Zealand in 2014. Afghanistan will join Pool A at the World Cup along with Australia, Bangladesh, England, New Zealand, Sri Lanka and another qualifier. On 24 November 2013, Afghanistan beat Kenya to qualify for the 2014 T20 world cup.

In March 2014, Afghanistan beat Hong Kong in the 2014 ICC World Twenty20 but could not make it to the next stage of super 10 having lost the two matches to Bangladesh and Nepal.

On 25 February 2015, Afghanistan won their first Cricket World Cup match beating Scotland by one wicket. Afghanistan participated in the World Twenty20 2016 in India. They were unable to qualify for the Semi-Finals of the International Tournament. They defeated the eventual champions, West Indies, during their final group match of the tournament.

Their third match was against the full member test team Zimbabwe. They played exceptionally well beating Zimbabwe by 59 runs. Afghanistan qualified for the Super 10 stage of the tournament as a result of this match, while Zimbabwe were eliminated. Afghanistan progressed to the second phase of a World Twenty20 tournament for the first time. On 25 June 2016, Lalchand Rajput was named as head coach of Afghanistan Cricket Team replacing Pakistan's Inzamam ul Haq with his first outings with the team being a tour of Scotland, Ireland and the Netherlands in July and August of that year. He was chosen ahead of Mohammad Yousuf, Herschelle Gibbs and Corey Collymore Rajput is in line for a two-year contract, but that decision would be finalised after the upcoming tour of Europe.

In July 2016, ACB unveiled a strategic plan and set targets for Afghanistan cricket team to be a top-six ODI team by 2019 and a top-three team in both T20Is and ODIs by 2025. In order to achieve this, ACB created a proposal to be presented to BCCI, to secure annual bilateral matches against India and teams touring India beginning the following year. Shafiq Stanikzai, Chief Executive of ACB, said the draft had been presented to BCCI president Anurag Thakur in May and further discussions occurred during the ICC Annual Conference in Edinburgh in June 2016.

On 25 July 2016, Afghanistan confirmed its first full series against West Indies a top-8 ranked Full member. Its earlier full series came against a permanent member of ICC was against Zimbabwe. Afghanistan toured the Caribbean islands in mid-June 2017 and played 5 ODIs and 3 T20Is.

On the same day, it was announced that Afghanistan would host a full series against Ireland at Greater Noida. Besides a 4-day intercontinental cup match, Ireland and Afghanistan would play five ODIs and three T20Is in March 2017. Afghanistan won the T20I series 3-0 and in the process set a new T20I record of 11 consecutive victories.

On 22 June 2017, the International Cricket Council (ICC) awarded Afghanistan full Test status, along with Ireland. In December 2017, the ICC confirmed that Afghanistan were scheduled to play their first Test against India, in late 2018. According to the ICC Future Tours Programme for 2019–23, Afghanistan are scheduled to play thirteen Tests. In January 2018, both the ACB and the BCCI confirmed the Test would be played in June in Bengaluru.

In June 2018, Afghanistan lost their maiden Test match to hosts India by an innings and 262 runs, despite being able to bowl out a strong Indian team in the first innings.

Rise as a Test team

In March 2019 against Ireland, Afghanistan achieved their first Test match victory in their only second Test match, becoming the fourth team after Australia, England and Pakistan to win one of their first two Tests.

In September 2019, Afghanistan beat hosts Bangladesh by 224 runs in a one-off Test tour. Rain almost resulted in the match being drawn, but finally the weather cleared, allowing the spin-unit of Afghanistan to take the final four wickets.

Grounds
Afghanistan typically did not play their home matches in Afghanistan due to the ongoing security situation and the lack of international standard facilities. Afghanistan played their 'home' Intercontinental Cup fixture against Ireland at the Rangiri Dambulla International Stadium in Sri Lanka. Following Afghanistan's World Twenty20 qualifying campaign they played two One Day Internationals against Canada at the Sharjah Cricket Association Stadium in the UAE, after which the stadium was named the 'home' ground of Afghanistan.

As plans to resurrect Afghan cricket developed, at least three international standard cricket stadiums have been built in Afghanistan. In 2016, Shahid Vijay Singh Pathik Sports Complex in Greater Noida became the home ground for the Afghanistan national cricket team after they decided to shift their home ground from Sharjah. In June 2018, after acquiring test status, Afghanistan changed their home base to Rajiv Gandhi International Cricket Stadium, Dehradun, India. In May 2019, Afghanistan Cricket Board requested BCCI for a new home stadium. In August 2019, BCCI approved Ekana Cricket Stadium in Lucknow, India as the new home stadium for the team.

The following are the main cricket stadiums in Afghanistan:
 Alokozay Kabul International Cricket Ground in Kabul
 Ghazi Amanullah International Cricket Stadium in Ghazi Amanullah Town, Jalalabad
 Kandahar International Cricket Stadium in Kandahar
 Khost Cricket Stadium in Khost

 Secondary Home Grounds (outside Afghanistan)
 Sharjah Cricket Association Stadium, Sharjah (2010–2016)
 Shaheed Vijay Singh Pathik Sports Complex, Greater Noida (2017)
 Rajiv Gandhi International Cricket Stadium, Dehradun (2018–2019)
 Bharat Ratna Shri Atal Bihari Vajpayee Ekana Cricket Stadium, Lucknow (2019)
 Sheikh Zayed Cricket Stadium, Abu Dhabi (2021)

Team colours

In test matches, Afghanistan wears cricket whites, with optional sweaters and vests for cold weather, with the ACB logo on the right breast of the shirt, the manufacturer logo on the leading arm sleeve and the sponsor logo on the center of the shirt. The fielders wear a red baseball-style cap or a white sunhat with ACB logo and the batsman helmet is coloured similar, with the Flag of Afghanistan above the ACB logo. In limited-overs cricket, Afghanistan wears a blue uniform in ODI (grey was previously used from 2012 to 2013), with splashes of green, red, black and occasionally, yellow. The ACB logo is featured on the right breast of the shirt and the sponsor logo on the center, with the inscription "AFGHANISTAN" beneath the sponsor logo and the manufacturer logo on the leading arm sleeve. For ICC Tournaments, the sponsor logo goes to the non-leading arm sleeve. The fielders wear a blue baseball-style cap or a red sunhat. The helmets are also red. The current sponsor is Monarch Mart, previously Alokozay Group and the kit manufacturer was TYKA Sports.

The national team kept using the black-red-green tricolour following the Taliban takeover of Afghanistan in 2021.

Current squad

This lists all the players who have played for Afghanistan in the past 12 months or was named in the most recent Test, ODI or T20I squad. Uncapped players are listed in italics.

Asghar Afghan and Javed Ahmadi played in the most recent Test series but have since retired from Afghanistan cricket.

Coaching staff

Coaching history
2001-2008:  Taj Malik
2008-2010:  Kabir Khan
2010-2011:  Rashid Latif
2011-2014:  Kabir Khan
2014-2015:  Andy Moles
2015-2016:  Inzamam-ul-Haq
2016-2017:  Lalchand Rajput
2017-2019:  Phil Simmons
2019-2021:  Lance Klusener
2021-2022:  Stuart Law (interim)
2022:  Graham Thorpe
2022:  Raees Ahmadzai (interim)
2022-present:  Jonathan Trott

Records

International match summary – Afghanistan

Last updated 19 February 2023.

Test matches
Afghanistan played their first ever test match against India on 14 June 2018 at Bengaluru, India.

 Highest team total: 545/4 v. Zimbabwe, 11 March 2021 at Sheikh Zayed Stadium
 Lowest team total: 103 v. India, 14 June 2018 at Bangalore

Most Test runs for Afghanistan

Most Test wickets for Afghanistan

Highest Test scores for Afghanistan

Best Test bowling figures for Afghanistan

Test record versus other nations

One-Day Internationals

 Highest team total: 338 v. Ireland, 17 March 2017 at Greater Noida
 Lowest team total: 58 v. Zimbabwe, 2 January 2016 at Sharjah

Most ODI runs for Afghanistan

Most ODI wickets for Afghanistan

Highest ODI scores for Afghanistan

Best ODI bowling figures for Afghanistan

ODI record versus other nations

Twenty20 Internationals

 12 consecutive wins, a record in the men's T20Is (5 February 2018 - 15 September 2019).
 Highest team total: 278/3 v. Ireland 23 February 2019, at Dehradun
 Lowest team total: 72 v. Bangladesh, 16 March 2014 at Dhaka
 Highest individual score: 162*, Hazratullah Zazai v. Ireland, 23 February 2019, at Dehradun
 Best individual bowling figures: 5/3, Rashid Khan v. Ireland, 10 March 2017 at Greater Noida

Most T20I runs for Afghanistan

Most T20I wickets for Afghanistan

T20I record versus other nations

Tournament history

ICC Cricket World Cup

ICC Trophy/ICC World Cup Qualifier

 1979–2001: Not eligible, not an ICC Member
 2005: Did not qualify
 2009: 5th place
 2018: Champions

ICC T20 World Cup

ICC World Twenty20 Qualifier

 2009: Not eligible, not an ODI nation at time of tournament
 2010: Winners
 2012: Runners-up
 2013: Runners-up
 2015: 5th position

ICC Intercontinental Cup

2009–10: Winners
2011–13: Runners-up
2015-17: Winners

ICC World Cricket League

 2008
Division Five winners
Division Four winners
 2009
Division Three winners
 2010
Division One 3rd Place
2011–13
Championship Runners Up

Asian Games

Asia Cup

ACC Premier League
 2014: Winners

ACC Trophy

 1996–2002: Not eligible, not an ACC Member.
 2004: 6th place
 2006: 3rd place
 2008: 3rd place (Elite)
 2010: Winners (Elite)

ACC Twenty20 Cup

ACC Under-19 Cup

 2014: 4th place
 2017: Winners

Desert T20 Challenge

 2017: Winners

Middle East Cup

 2006: Runners-up

Honours

Others
Asian Games
 Silver Medal (2): 2010, 2014

See also
 Cricket in Afghanistan
 Afghanistan at the Cricket World Cup
 Afghanistan women's national cricket team
 List of Afghanistan Test cricketers
 List of Afghanistan ODI cricketers
 List of Afghanistan T20I cricketers
 List of Afghanistan first-class cricketers
 Afghan national cricket captains
 List of Afghanistan Twenty20 International cricket records
 Afghanistan A cricket team
 Out of the Ashes (2010 film), a 2010 documentary film
 Afghanistan–Pakistan cricket rivalry

References

External links

Cricket in Afghanistan
National cricket teams
Cricket
Afghanistan in international cricket
Cricket teams in Afghanistan
2001 establishments in Afghanistan
Laureus World Sports Awards winners